The Bayntun-Sandys Baronetcy, of Miserden Castle in the County of Gloucester and of Chadlington Hall in the County of Oxford, was a title in the Baronetage of the United Kingdom. It was created on 26 September 1809 for Edwin Bayntun-Sandys (1774–1848). He had been born Edwin Sandys, but had assumed the additional surname of Bayntun by Royal sign manual in 1807 in order to inherit from the will of William Bayntun (1717–1785), a lawyer of Gray's Inn and widower of his first cousin once removed, Catherine Sandys (1737–1804).

Bayntun-Sandys's eldest son, Edwin Windsor Bayntun-Sandys (1801–38), was knighted in 1825 but predeceased his father in 1838, as did his only brother Miles Allen Bayntun-Sandys (1766–1813). Consequently, the title became extinct on Bayntun-Sandys's death in 1848.

Bayntun-Sandys baronets, of Miserden Castle and Chadlington Hall (1809)

Sir Edwin Bayntun-Sandys, 1st and last Baronet (1774–1848)
Sir Edwin Windsor Bayntun-Sandys (1801–1838)

References

Extinct baronetcies in the Baronetage of the United Kingdom